Dufry AG is a Swiss-based travel retailer which operates duty-free and duty-paid shops and convenience stores in airports, cruise lines, seaports, railway stations and central tourist areas. The company, headquartered in Basel, employs almost 36,000 people and operates in over 65 countries worldwide. It is publicly traded on the SIX Swiss Exchange.

Retail brands
The company's retail brands are:

Hudson
World Duty Free

 Hellenic Duty Free Shops
 Reg Staer
 Colombian Emeralds
 Duty Free Uruguay
 Duty Free Shop Argentina

In addition, Dufry is also used as a brand name for some general travel retail shops.

History
The company owns stores at airports, railway stations and ports, and operates concessions onboard airlines and cruise ships.

Milestones 
 2020: Hudson becomes a wholly owned subsidiary of Dufry and is delisted from the NYSE.
 2019: Dufry acquires a 60% stake of RegStaer Vnukovo. 
 2018: Dufry's subsidiary Hudson Ltd. listed on the New York Stock Exchange (NYSE) with its first trading day on February 1, 2018
 2016: Renewal of existing concession contracts. Company is included in the Swiss Leader Index, compiled of the 30 largest Swiss Corporations listed on the SIX Swiss Exchange.
 2015: Acquisition of World Duty Free
 2014: Acquisition of The Nuance Group
 2012: Acquisition of 51% of joint venture with RegStaer Group in Russia. Acquisition of 51% of travel retail operations of Folli Follie Group in Greece
 2011: Acquisitions of retail companies within Argentina, Uruguay, Ecuador, Martinique and Armenia, involve 21 duty-free shops split between ten airports
 2010: Merger of Dufry Ltd. With Dufry South America Ltd.
 2008: Acquisition of US based travel retailer Hudson Group with 550 shops in 69 airports and transportation terminals in the United States and Canada.
 2007: Acquisition of one of the main travel retail operator in the Caribbean based in Puerto Rico with 23 shops in Puerto Rico and other Caribbean locations.
 2006: Initial Public Offering of Dufry South America Ltd. (DSA) in December. Trading of the shares on the Brazilian and Luxembourg stock exchanges. Acquisition of the Brazilian travel retailer Brasif and its logistic platform Eurotrade.
 2005: Dufry becomes a publicly listed company – its shares being listed on SIX Swiss Exchange. Acquisition of the remaining 25% share capital from previous shareholders by a consortium led by Advent International Corporation. Change of logo / corporate design.
 2004: Consortium led by Advent International Corporation acquires 75% of outstanding share capital of Dufry. Focusing of strategy on travel retail –  divestment of wholesale and non-strategic activities (February).
 2003: Name changes to Dufry.
 1952: Start of duty-free retail business – opening of the first duty-free shop in continental Europe in Paris/Le Bourget.
 1948: Start of duty-free wholesale business.
 1865: Origin of the group.

Location

Some of the principal locations of the company are:
 Zurich Airport, Kloten, (Switzerland)
 EuroAirport Basel Mulhouse Freiburg, Basel, (Switzerland)
 Sabiha Gökçen International Airport, Istanbul, (Turkey)
 Zvartnots International Airport, Yerevan, (Armenia)
 Shirak International Airport, Gyumri, (Armenia)
 Vancouver International Airport, Vancouver (Canada)
 Las Americas International Airport, Santo Domingo (Dominican Republic)
 Melbourne Airport, Melbourne, (Australia)
 Ministro Pistarini International Airport, Buenos Aires (Argentina)
 Guarulhos International Airport, São Paulo (Brazil)
 Kempegowda International Airport, Bangalore (India)
 Benito Juárez International Airport, Mexico City (Mexico)
 Malpensa International Airport (Italy)
 All of Milan's railway stations (Italy)
 Jorge Chavez International Airport, Lima (Peru)
 Sharjah International Airport (United Arab Emirates)
 Mohammed V International Airport, Casablanca (Morocco)
 Sheremetyevo International Airport, Moscow (Russia)
 El Dorado Airport, Bogotá (Colombia)
 Siem Reap International Airport (Cambodia)
 Phnom Penh International Airport (Cambodia)
 Hong Kong West Kowloon railway station (Hong Kong)
P&O Ferries (United Kingdom)

See also
 List of duty-free shops

References

External links
 
 Dufry annual report

Retail companies of Switzerland
Retail companies of Brazil
Companies listed on the SIX Swiss Exchange
Companies listed on B3 (stock exchange)
Retail companies established in 1865
Swiss companies established in 1865
Companies based in Basel
Duty-free shops